Šternberk is a town in Olomouc District in the Olomouc Region of the Czech Republic. It has about 13,000 inhabitants. The historic town centre is well preserved and is protected by law as an urban monument zone.

Administrative parts
Villages of Chabičov, Dalov, Krakořice and Těšíkov are administrative parts of Šternberk. Těšíkov forms an exclave of the municipal territory.

Geography
It lies on the stream Sitka.

Šternberk lies on the border of two geomorphological units. Most of the territory belongs to the Nízký Jeseník mountain range within the Eastern Sudetes. Eastern part of the town lies in the Upper Morava Valley.

History

The first written mention of Šternberk is from 1269, when the Šternberk Castle appeared in a deed of Ottokar II of Bohemia. The castle was founded between 1253 and 1269. The town of Šternberk was first mentioned in 1296, in a deed of the Šternberk's owner, Albert of Šternberk. Although it was referred to as a town, it did not become a full-fledged town until the turn of the 14th and 15th centuries.

Albert of Šternberk colonized the town with German colonist, which led to an ethnically mixed population. The lords of Šternberk gradually expanded the dominion. The town developed mainly during the rule of Albert II of Šternberk, who had built the town walls and founded the Augustinian monastery in 1371. After the death of Petr of Šternberk in 1397, the Šternberk dominion was inherited by lords of Kravaře.

The lords of Kravaře further improved the town. During the Hussite Wars in 1430, the town was conquered by the Hussites. After the death of the last male member of the lords of Kravaře, Šternberk further changed its owners, which were the families of Kostka of Postupice (1466–1480) and Berka of Dubá (1480–1570), Dukes of Münsterberg (1570–1647), and House of Württemberg (1647–1693).

In 1633–1634, Šternberk was devastated by a plague epidemic. In the 1640s, during the Thirty Years' War, the town was conquered and looted several times by the Swedish army. After the war, the population was predominantly German. In 1693, Šternberk was acquired by the House of Liechtenstein, which owned it until 1945. New development did not occur until the second half of the 18th century. The town began to grow economically thanks to weaving.

Until 1918, Šternberk was part of the Austrian monarchy (Austria side after the compromise of 1867), head of the district with the same name, one of the 34 Bezirkshauptmannschaften in Moravia.

In 1938, after the Munich Agreement, it was occupied by the Nazi army as one of the municipalities in Sudetenland. The German-speaking population was expelled in 1945–1946 according to the Beneš decrees and replaced by Czech settlers.

Demographics

Sport
Šternberk is known for racing track called Ecce Homo on which the eponymous hillclimbing car race is held annually. The first race was held here in 1905 and the tradition of regular Ecce Homo race began in 1921.

Sights

Šternberk Castle is the main landmark of the town. The Gothic castle was reconstructed into a modern aristocratic residence in 1886. The castle forest park was founded in 1907–1909. Today the state-owned castle is open to the public and offers sightseeing tours.

The former Augustinian monastery is a valuable Baroque monument. After it was used as barracks, a German grammar school and a textile warehouse, the building was repaired and today contains museum expositions and exhibition spaces, including the gallery of painter Johann Christoph Handke.

The Church of the Annunciation was founded together with the monastery in 1371. After it burned down two times, the original Gothic church was demolished in 1775, and a new Neoclassical church was built on its site in 1775–1783. After the monastery was abolished, the church became a parish church. It contains paintings by Josef Winterhalder the Younger and Leopold Kupelwieser. The chapel is decorated by a rare ceiling painting by Johann Christoph Handke, depicting the history of Šternberk.

Notable people

Eduard Reich (1836–1919), physician
Oscar Gelbfuhs (1852–1877), chess player
Walter von Molo (1880–1958), chess player
Lubor Tokoš (1923–2003), actor
Erica Pedretti (born 1930), Swiss writer and artist
Eckhart Schmidt (born 1938), German film director
Hana Maciuchová (1945–2021), actress
Mikuláš Bek (born 1964), musicologist and politician
Robert Hock (born 1973), German ice hockey player
Adriana Gerši (born 1976), tennis player 
Patrik Siegl (born 1976), footballer
Tomáš Žižka (born 1979), ice hockey player
David Rozehnal (born 1980), footballer
Jana Doleželová (born 1981), Miss Czech Republic 2004
Petr Vrána (born 1985), ice hockey player
David Krejčí (born 1986), ice hockey player
Gabriela Vařeková (born 1987), rower
Blanka Škodová (born 1997), ice hockey player
Václav Chaloupka (born 1998), slalom canoeist

Twin towns – sister cities

Šternberk is twinned with:
 Dobšiná, Slovakia
 Günzburg, Germany
 Kobiór, Poland
 Kungsbacka, Sweden
 Lorsch, Germany
 Sajószentpéter, Hungary

Gallery

References

External links

Populated places in Olomouc District
Cities and towns in the Czech Republic
House of Liechtenstein